Rewa Football Club is a Fijian semi-professional football club based in Nausori, playing in the National Football League. Rewa's home ground is Vodafone Ratu Cakobau Park

Rewa is a pretty successful club in Fiji. They have won many tournaments throughout their history and finally won their first ever national league title in 2022.

History 
A league competition was organised in Rewa for the first time in 1928, although football was known to be played in the area since 1916. In 1928, two teams from Rewa, Dilkusha Excelsior Football Club and Rewa Football Club took part in competition organised by the Suva based Indian Reform League for the Vriddhi Cup. The other two teams were from Suva. Dilkusha won the trophy and repeated its success in 1929 and 1930. Having won the trophy three times in a row, Dilkusha was allowed to permanently keep the trophy and the competition came to end. From 1931 to 1936, Rewa United Football Club took part in the Fletcher Challenge Cup organised by the Indian Reform League of Suva. In 1937, the Rewa Indian Football Association was formed. The Rewa Association was one of the founding members of the Fiji Indian Football Association in 1938, which in 1961 became the Fiji Football Association.

Rewa won the first Inter-district competition (IDC) held in Suva in 1938, defeating Ba by 3 goals to 2 in the final.  In June 1939, Rewa, as the IDC champions played against a team from the naval ship, H.M.S. Leath at the C.S.R. grounds in Nausori. Rewa won the game by a lone goal, watched by a thousand fans.

Rewa Football Association currently consists of more than 42 clubs. The football club has done well in recent times, winning the Battle of Giants tournament in 2003 and 2004. Above all win or loss, Rewa has the strongest support from their fans and they are very vocal.

Rewa qualified for the first time to 2017 OFC Champions League.

Current squad
As of 5 August 2022.

Personnel

Achievements
League Championship (for Districts): 1

Fiji National Football League: 1
 2022

 Inter-District Championship : 9
 1938, 1939, 1943, 1944, 1947, 1955, 1972, 2001, 2010.

Battle of the Giants: 9
 1994, 2003, 2004, 2010, 2011, 2014, 2015, 2017, 2020.

Fiji Football Association Cup Tournament: 3
 2011, 2017, 2018.

Champion versus Champion: 1
 2010.

Fiji Games: 1
 1994 (Gold Medalist).

See also 

 Fiji Football Association

Bibliography 
 M. Prasad, Sixty Years of Soccer in Fiji 1938–1998: The Official History of the Fiji Football Association, Fiji Football Association, Suva, 1998.

References

Football clubs in Fiji
1928 establishments in Fiji
Association football clubs established in 1928